An execution ballad is a type of ballad that details the execution of a prisoner or criminal. A popular form of street literature from the 1500s to 1800s across Europe, these ballads often described graphic violence and depicted the gruesome deaths of the subject as a way to warn the public about the potential consequences of committing crime. They were mostly known to be sung to the tune of popular songs, but were also sold publicly on broadsides and pamphlets.

Use of song was a popular method of spreading news across a community in early modern Europe; music and lyrics were easier to remember, and thus made it easier to spread than written news, as many people were illiterate during the height of its popularity. Execution ballads were intended as a method of warning the public of the consequences of committing a crime. The subject of the ballad often spoke in first-person and was portrayed as guilty and remorseful, placing an emphasis on begging the listener to learn from their mistake. They were sold on the day of the execution, or sometimes the following days. There was usually no music notation included, only a cue to sing it to the tune of a popular song.

See also 
 Murder ballad
 Street literature
 Broadside ballad

References 

Ballads

16th-century music genres
17th-century music genres
18th-century music genres
19th-century music genres
Song forms